Seattle, Washington, United States has almost twenty neighborhoods that host one or more street fairs and/or parades.

Ballard 

 17 May Festival - Syttende Mai 
 Ballard Seafood Fest: a Seafair-sanctioned event
 Sustainable Ballard Festival

Beacon Hill 

 Beacon Hill Block Party

Capitol Hill 
 Capitol Hill Block Party

Central District 
 Central Area Community Festival

Downtown 
 Pike Place Market Street Festival
 Pioneer Square Fire Festival
 Seattle Pride Parade and PrideFest
 Torchlight Parade

Eastlake
 Lake Union's LakeFest

Fremont 

 Fremont Fair: origin of the Summer Solstice Parade and Pageant
 Fremont Octoberfest

Georgetown 
 Georgetown Music Festival

Greenwood and Phinney Ridge 
 Greenwood-Phinney Seafair Parade: a Seafair-sanctioned event

Chinatown-International District 
 Chinatown Seafair Parade: a Seafair-sanctioned event
 Dragon Fest
 Lunar New Year Celebration
 CID Night Market
 CID Food Walk
 CID Block Party

Lake City 
 Lake City Pioneer Days: a Seafair-sanctioned event

Magnolia 
 Magnolia Summer Festival and Art Show: a Seafair-sanctioned event

Mount Baker 
 Mount Baker Day in the Park

Queen Anne 
 The Crown of Queen Anne Fun Run, Walk & Children's Parade: a Seafair-sanctioned event

Rainier Valley 
 Rainier Valley SummerFest and Rainier Valley Heritage Parade

Roosevelt 
 Roosevelt Bull Moose Festival: a Seafair-sanctioned event

South Lake Union 
 South Lake Union Block Party

University District 

 University District Street Fair

Wallingford 
 Wallingford Seafair Kiddie Parade & Street Fair: a Seafair sanctioned event
 Wallingford Wurst Fest

West Seattle 
 West Seattle Grand Parade: a Seafair-sanctioned event
 West Seattle Summer Fest

White Center 
 White Center Jubilee Days Parade: a Seafair-sanctioned event

Notes 

Culture of Seattle
Tourist attractions in Seattle
Seattle
Seattle
and
Street fairs